The Kansas Children's Discovery Center is a nonprofit children's museum for children and families to explore and discover science, art, engineering, and nature together.  The Discovery Center is located in Topeka's treasured Gage Park at 4400 SW 10th Ave Topeka, Kansas.

External links
 Kansas Children's Discovery Center 

Museums in Topeka, Kansas
Children's museums in Kansas